L'Affaire Dumont is a Canadian drama film, released in 2012. Written by Danielle Dansereau based on a true story and directed by Daniel "Podz" Grou, the film stars Marc-André Grondin as Michel Dumont, a divorced young father of two who is accused of a sexual assault he did not commit.

The film's cast also includes Geneviève Brouillette, Patrick Hivon, Marilyn Castonguay, Emmanuel Schwartz, Guy Thauvette and Cynthia Wu-Maheux.

Accolades

References

External links

2012 films
Canadian drama films
Films directed by Daniel Grou
2012 drama films
Films about pedophilia
Canadian films based on actual events
French-language Canadian films
2010s Canadian films
2010s French-language films